The subfamily Poiocerinae include Hemipteran insects in the family Fulgoridae, found especially in the tropics.

Tribes and genera 
The Fulgoromorpha Lists On the Web (FLOW) includes four tribes:

Diloburini 
Auth. Metcalf, 1938 (central & South America)
 Aracynthus Stål, 1866
 Dilobura Spinola, 1839
 Echetra Walker, 1858
 Episcius Spinola, 1839
 Japetus Stål, 1863
 Obia Distant, 1887
 Zepasa Distant, 1906

Lystrini 
Auth. Spinola, 1839
 Lystra Fabricius, 1803
 Lystrenia Fennah & Carvalho, 1963

Paralystrini 
Auth. Metcalf, 1938 (South America)
 Paralystra White, 1846

Poiocerini 
Auth. Haupt, 1929

Calyptoproctina subtribe 

Auth. Metcalf, 1938 (Americas, Asia, Australasia)
 Alphina Stål, 1863
 Birdantis Stål, 1863
 Brasiliana Lallemand, 1959
 Calyptoproctus Spinola, 1839
 Coptopola Stål, 1869
 Curetia Stål, 1862
 Cyrpoptus Stål, 1862
 Desudaba Walker, 1858
 Desudaboides Musgrave, 1927
 Erilla Distant, 1906 
 Galela Distant, 1906 
 Gebenna Stål, 1863
 Jamaicastes Kirkaldy, 1900
 Kutariana Nast, 1950
 Learcha Stål, 1863
 Matacosa Distant, 1906
 Oeagra Stål, 1863
 Polydictya Guérin-Méneville, 1844
 Scaralis Stål, 1863
 Tabocasa Distant, 1906
 Talloisia Lallemand, 1959

Poiocerina sub-tribe 

Auth. Haupt, 1929 (Americas)
 Aburia Stål, 1866
 Acmonia Stål, 1866
 Acraephia Stål, 1866
 Alaruasa Distant, 1906
 Aliphera Stål, 1866
 Amantia Stål, 1864
 Auchalea Gerstaecker, 1895
 Crepusia Stål, 1866
 Florichisme Kirkaldy, 1904
 Hypaepa Stål, 1862
 Itzalana Distant, 1905
 Oomima Berg, 1879
 Poblicia Stål, 1866
 Poiocera De Laporte, 1832   (type genus)
 Zeunasa Distant, 1906

References

External links

FLOW: Poiocerinae

 
Hemiptera subfamilies